The Dream Job (Chinese: 绝世好工) is a Singaporean drama produced and telecast on Mediacorp Channel 8. The show aired at 9pm on weekdays and had a repeat telecast at 8am the following day. The series stars Shaun Chen, Jeanette Aw, Rebecca Lim, Zhang Zhenhuan, Ian Fang and Hong Kong veteran actor, Hugo Ng, as the main cast. The show is Channel 8 mid year blockbuster for 2016. The Series is repeated at 5.30pm on weekdays in 2017, 4.30pm on weekends in 2019 and 7.30am on weekends in 2021.

Cast

Main cast

{| class="wikitable"
|-
!style="background:#d6a387; color:white"| Cast 
!style="background:#d6a387; color:white"| Character 
!style="background:#d6a387; color:white"| Description 
!style="background:#d6a387; color:white"| Episodes Appeared
|-
| Hugo Ng  吳岱融 || Zhang Qingdong  张庆东 || Main Protagonist  Owner of Purple Garden Landscaping Teo Keng Tong  A man with two illegitimate children due to his many affairs in the past  Liang Yongqiang's distant cousin  Love triangle with Lin Melian and Wang Bizhi  Li Junfeng, Cheng Huishan and Lin Zijie's father  Zhang Lixing's adopted father  Huang Xiumei's son-in-law  Li Junfeng and Huang Xiumei's sworn enemy  Revealed to have lung cancer in episode 8  Cause the death of Junfeng's grandmother to have Cerebral hemorrhage after Junfeng's grandmother had a tussle with him.  Suffered a stroke in episode 19 due to too much heartache.  Died after his meet with Junfeng; caused by Zhang Mingde and him engaging in a scuffle  (Deceased - Episode 25) || 1-25
|-
| Shaun Chen  陈泓宇 || Li Junfeng / Zhang Junfeng  李俊风 / 张俊枫 || Main Villain But Repented (at the end of the series) Younger version portrayed by Ian Teng (丁翊)  Teenage version portrayed by Gary Tan (陈毅丰)   Lawyer Lee Choon Feng  Chen Yiqing's boyfriend, broke up on episode 21  Likes Jiang Xinya  Zhang Qingdong and Li Ziyun's son  Huang Xiumei's grandson  Zhang Lixing, Cheng Huishan and Lin Zijie's half elder brother  Despise Zhang Qingdong and plans to avenge his mom 
Did many dirty things Persuaded Tim to chase Chen Huishan back because of the money

Betrayed Tim Caused the revelation of Chen Huishan and Zijie's biological dad in episode 8  Convinced Jiang Xinya to accept Zhang Lixing's love to manipulate him for money  Vows to get revenge and hates Zhang Qingdong more after the death of his grandmother  Watched Zhang Qingdong having stroke at his grandmother's grave and leave without caring in episode 19  Arrested by the police but was later set free as he is not the murderer of Zhang Qingdong  Called people to beat up Zhang Mingde in episode 28

Indirectly caused the death of Zhang Mingde
| 1-30  3–8, 10–11,24 (younger)  6-7 (teenage)
|-
| Zhang Zhenhuan  张振寰 || Zhang Lixing  张立行 ||  Teo Lip Heng  Younger version portrayed by Alston Yeo (杨峻毅)  Zhang Qingdong's adopted son  Cheng Huishan's husband  Zhang Mingde and Li Ziyun's biological son  Huang Xiumei's grandson  Li Junfeng's half younger brother  Likes Jiang Xinya  Deaf in his right ear  Confessed to Jiang Xinya in episode 13  Secretly listened to Huishan's confession to him by acting asleep  Married Cheng Huishan in episode 30 || 2-30  3–5, 7–8, 10–11, 24 (younger)
|-
| Jeanette Aw  欧萱 || Cheng Huishan  程卉杉 || Senior financial consultant Thia Hui Say Younger version portrayed byTeenage version portrayed by Dora Teo (张淑婷)  Wang Bizhi's daughter  Zhang Qingdong's recruited daughter, later revealed as biological  Li Junfeng's half younger sister  Lin Zijie's half elder sister  Zhang Lixing's wife  Tim Goh's ex-girlfriend  Recruited in The Dream Job recruitments as the eldest daughter  Has allergic rhinitis when in contact with pollen  Reaccepted Tim to be his boyfriend in episode 14  Betrayed by Tim again in episode 17  Kidnapped by Tim and almost fell off a rooftop but was saved by Tim and was also told by Tim about Junfeng's evil deeds in episode 19  Married Zhang Lixing in episode 30 || 1-17, 19-30  5, 7–8, 10 (younger)  10 (teenage)
|-
| Rebecca Lim  林慧玲 || Jiang Xinya  江欣雅 || Nurse Kang Hiam Nga Zhang Qingdong's recruited daughter  Qiu Xinling's elder sister  Li Junfeng and He Jiazheng's love Interest  Recruited in The Dream Job recruitments as the second daughter  Dated Lixing in episode 13 but was not sincere about the feeling because Junfeng told her to do so  Kissed Junfeng on episode 18 || 1-20, 22-30
|-
| Ian Fang  方伟杰 || Lin Zijie  林梓杰 ||  Lim Chu Kiat 
Television drama cameo  Younger version portrayed by Donald Chong (张俊豪)  Lin Meilan's son  Zhang Qingdong's recruited son, later revealed as biological  Pan Xiaoxue's boyfriend  Li Junfeng and Cheng Huishan's half younger brother  Recruited in The Dream Job recruitments as the younger son  Was drunk and slept with Pan Xiaoxue on episode 16
|| 1-11, 13–18, 20–21, 25-30  8, 11 (younger)
|-
| Aileen Tan  陈丽贞 || Wang Bizhi  王碧芝 || Villain But Repented' Cheng Huishan's mother  Lin Meilan's rival-in-love, but later reconcile Sacked by her employer, who colluded with Li Junfeng in episode 7  Moved to Zhang Qingdong's house in episode 10  Fought with Lin Meilian in episode 26  Attempted to make Xiaoxue fell down on a stair in episode 26  Caused Zijie to be jailed || 2, 7, 9-15, 17, 19–23, 25-30
|-
| Pan Lingling  潘玲玲 || Lin Meilan  林美兰 || Nightclub singer  Lin Zijie's mother  Wang Bizhi's rival-in-love, but later reconcileFought with Wang Bizhi in episode 26 due to Bizhi
almost caused her daughter-in-law, Pan Xiaoxue's miscarriage
|| 2, 4, 8-11, 13, 15, 17–18, 20–23, 25-30
|-
|}

Supporting cast

Cameo appearance

Development
First announced in December 2015, the drama series features a strong story plot by maestros behind Hong Kong's mega-hit and award-winning drama Heart of Greed, Lee Ji-wah and Suen Hou Hou. Targeted to reach an extensive audience from family, working women to Professionals, Managers, Executives and Businessmen (PMEBs), the publicity for the drama will be on multi-platforms from teaser recruitment ads, on-ground Recruitment Roadshow, Toggle microsite coupled with social media activation, launch trailers on radio channels, Press Conference and Meet and Greet. Major sponsors include Subway, Daikin, Mama Magica and Simmons.

Imaging sessions were done in the month of December 2015. New daddy Shaun Chen plays a lawyer who sets out to take revenge against a father he grew up hating. This is his first role after his Star Awards 2015 Best Actor win, not before he completed filming The Journey: Our Homeland, and his second onscreen couple collaboration with Best Actress Rebecca Lim, after The Dream Makers. On the other hand, Jeanette Aw plays an ambitious, driven career woman, which was different from the other roles she has portrayed over the years. In a Toggle interview, she said, "I used to play characters with gentle exteriors but tough personalities, but for Huishan it’s the opposite. She doesn’t display her weaknesses or tell anyone of the difficulties she faces." Hong Kong veteran actor, Hugo Ng, who played in Singaporean dramas Takeover and Men of Valour in the 1980s, returns to Singapore screens for the drama, playing a wealthy businessman who hires the characters of Aw, Rebecca Lim and Ian Fang as his son and daughters. He and his family returned to Singapore, as his son will be enlisted for National Service the following year.

The drama held its soft launch on 26 January 2016, one month after filming commenced. Hugo Ng, Shaun Chen, Jeanette Aw, Rebecca Lim, Zhang Zhenhuan, Ian Fang, Aileen Tan, Pan Lingling, Romeo Tan, Sheila Sim, Somaline Ang, Brandon Wong, Bonnie Loo and Chen Tianwen were present at the event. The cast also shared their first jobs at the launch. The production crew and cast (Shaun Chen, Aw, Lim and Zhang), together with the Toggle reporting crew, head to Perth on 18 March for a week of filming. Toggle made live reports throughout their stint. The cast also provided their experiences while filming for the show on Fridays, beginning from 20 May. Back in Singapore, filming for Cheng Huishan and Zhang Lixing (played by Aw and Zhang)'s wedding was on 28 March. Shaun Chen disclosed that his family "may attend Star Awards 2016", and he is jam-packed with filming commitments - he might fly to Taiwan to film a movie in April, before returning to star in Hero the following month, also starring Chen Hanwei and Jesseca Liu. Filming wrapped up in April 2016.

A press conference was held at Swissôtel The Stamford on 21 June 2016. Hugo Ng, Shaun Chen, Rebecca Lim, Ian Fang, Aileen Tan, Pan Lingling, Romeo Tan, Sheila Sim, Somaline Ang, Bonnie Loo and Chen Tianwen attended the conference. Notably absent were Jeanette Aw, who was away on a holiday, and Zhang Zhenhuan, who was filming Legal Eagles in Malaysia. A meet-and-greet session was held on 25 June at Changi City Point. Ng and Pan were not present at the event, but Wong, who was also absent from the conference, joined the other nine. The first 150 audience to form the queue for the event got to receive an autographed poster and a goodie bag each.

Original Sound Track (OST)

Awards & Nominations
Star Awards 2017The Dream Job is up for 9 nominations.

The other drama serials that are nominated for Star Awards 2017 are Hero, C.L.I.F. 4, Fire Up and You Can Be an Angel 2.

The other drama serials that are nominated for Best Theme Song are You Can Be an Angel 2, Eat Already?, Life - Fear Not and If Only I Could''.

It won 3 out of 9 nominations.

See also
List of MediaCorp Channel 8 Chinese drama series (2010s)
List of The Dream Job episodes

References

Singapore Chinese dramas
2016 Singaporean television series debuts
2016 Singaporean television series endings
Television shows set in Singapore
Television shows set in Perth, Western Australia
Channel 8 (Singapore) original programming